Felts Mills Creek is a creek that flows into the Black River in Felts Mills, New York. A parking area and access trail was opened in September 2008 as part of a conservation fund project commissioned by the New York state Department of Environmental Conservation.

References 

Rivers of Jefferson County, New York